Asaramanitra Ratiarison (born 7 January 1988) is a Malagasy judoka.

She competed at the 2016 Summer Olympics in Rio de Janeiro, in the women's 48 kg. She was defeated by Dayaris Mestre Alvarez of Cuba in the first round. She was the flag bearer for Madagascar during the closing ceremony.

References

External links
 

1988 births
Living people
Malagasy female judoka
Olympic judoka of Madagascar
Judoka at the 2016 Summer Olympics